Aderpas is a tribe of longhorn beetles of the subfamily Lamiinae. It was described by Breuning and Téocchi in 1977. It is the only genus in the tribe, Aderpasini, and contains the following species:

 Aderpas brunneus (Thomson, 1858)
 Aderpas congolensis Hintz, 1913
 Aderpas griseotinctus Hunt & Breuning, 1955
 Aderpas griseus (Thomson, 1858)
 Aderpas lineolatus (Chevrolat, 1858)
 Aderpas nyassicus Breuning, 1935
 Aderpas obliquefasciatus Breuning, 1974
 Aderpas pauper (Fahraeus, 1872)
 Aderpas punctulatus Jordan, 1894
 Aderpas subfasciatus Jordan, 1894

References

 
Cerambycidae genera